Betty Jardine (17 April 1903 – 28 February 1945) was a British stage and film actress.

She began as an actress in Manchester in 1926. In 1934 she made her West End debut in Disharmony at the Fortune Theatre. Subsequent roles were in the Emlyn Williams plays Night Must Fall in 1935 and The Corn Is Green in 1938.

Jardine was married to the psychoanalyst Wilfred Bion with whom she had a daughter, Parthenope. Jardine died a few days after the birth, from a pulmonary embolism.

Filmography

References

Bibliography 
 Gomez, Lavinia. Developments in Object Relations: Controversies, Conflicts, and Common Ground. Taylor & Francis, 2017.
 Wearing, J.P. The London Stage 1930-1939: A Calendar of Productions, Performers, and Personnel.  Rowman & Littlefield, 2014.

External links 
 

1903 births
1945 deaths
People from Stockport
English film actresses
English stage actresses
Deaths in childbirth
Deaths from pulmonary embolism
20th-century English actresses